Jawahar Navodaya Vidyalaya, Daman or JNV Dunetha as it is known locally, is a boarding, co-educational  school in Daman district, U.T. of Daman and Diu  in India. JNV Daman is funded by M.H.R.D. and administered  by Navodaya Vidyalaya Smiti, an autonomous body under the ministry. Navodaya Vidyalayas offer free education to gifted children, from Class VI to XII.

History 
This school was established in 1989, and is a part of Jawahar Navodaya Vidyalaya schools. JNV Daman shifted to its permanent campus at Dunetha in 1996. This school is administered and monitored by Pune regional office of Navodaya Vidyalaya Smiti.

Admission 
Admission to JNV Daman at class VI level is made through nationwide selection test conducted by Navodaya Vidyalaya Smiti. The information about test is disseminated and advertised in Daman district by the office of Daman district magistrate (Collector), who is also the chairperson of Vidyalya Management Committee of JNV Daman.

Affiliations 
JNV Daman is affiliated to Central Board of Secondary Education with affiliation number 3140002 .

See also 

 List of JNV schools
 Jawahar Navodaya Vidyalaya, Diu

References

External links 

 Official Website of JNV Daman

Daman
Educational institutions established in 1989
1989 establishments in Daman and Diu
Daman district, India
Daman, India
Schools in Dadra and Nagar Haveli and Daman and Diu